"Little Bit of You" is a song recorded by American country music artist Chase Bryant. It was released in March 2015 as the second single from his self-titled EP. Bryant wrote the song with Derek George and Ashley Gorley.

Critical reception
Taste of Country reviewed the single favorably, saying that "Chase Bryant’s “Little Bit of You” is an uptempo love song that should assimilate nicely with what country fans find on the radio. The newcomer will continue to draw comparisons to Keith Urban with this track. It’s well-written pop-country with small windows for his musicianship."

Music video
The music video was directed by Jeff Johnson and premiered in February 2016.

Chart performance
The song has sold 131,000 copies in the US as of May 2016.

Year-end charts

References

2014 songs
2015 singles
Chase Bryant songs
BBR Music Group singles
Songs written by Derek George
Songs written by Ashley Gorley